Ricardo Gué Rosa Cardoso (born 23 September 2001) is a footballer who plays as a winger for Skellefteå FF. Born in Portugal, he represents the São Tomé and Príncipe national team.

International career
Cardoso made his professional debut with the São Tomé and Príncipe national team in a 2–0 2021 Africa Cup of Nations qualification loss to Sudan on 24 March 2021.

References

External links
 
 
 
 
 Profile at Finnish FA
 Instagram Profile: https://www.instagram.com/ricardocardoso_11/?next=%2F

2001 births
Living people
Sportspeople from Funchal
People with acquired São Tomé and Príncipe citizenship
São Tomé and Príncipe footballers
São Tomé and Príncipe international footballers
Portuguese footballers
Portuguese people of São Tomé and Príncipe descent
Association football forwards
Campeonato de Portugal (league) players
Expatriate footballers in Finland
Klubi 04 players
Kakkonen players
São Tomé and Príncipe expatriate footballers
São Tomé and Príncipe expatriate sportspeople in Finland